The KYVE Apple Bowl is a televised single elimination competition between high school students. Over a period of one to five weeks, 20–30 high schools in Central Washington compete at the Apple Bowl studio, located on the Central Washington University campus in Ellensburg, Washington. The competition format includes lightning, tossup, and bonus rounds. The first and second place team members receive checks from Washington Apple Education Foundation, and the two-foot tall traveling Apple Bowl Cup is displayed at the first place school until the next competition season. Seniors on the first, second, and third place teams also win $3,000 or $2,000 tuition waivers for CWU. Many of the teams also participate in Knowledge Bowl and Quiz Bowl.

The competition is co-produced by Central Washington University and airs on PBS station KYVE studio in Yakima each spring. The program reaches an audience of over 200,000 families in the Central Washington area.

History

Apple Bowl first began in 1980. The program does not have a regular host. KNDO news anchor Dave Ettl was the longtime host for a stint ending with the 2003 tournament. The 2004 event also brought about other changes, including the relocation of tapings from the KYVE studio in Yakima to Central Washington University and had the team members play standing where previously they sat.

The winning team for the 2012 season was from West Valley High School, the winning school from 2011. Team members received $1500 in personal checks. The runner-up team of Prosser received $500 in checks. Before 2008, first and second place teams received savings bonds from the Washington Apple Education Foundation.

Winners

References

Education in Washington (state)
Student quiz competitions
Student quiz television series
1980 American television series debuts
2012 American television series endings